José Arley Dinas Rodríguez, or simply known as Arley Dinas (born May 16, 1974) is a former Colombian football player.

Club statistics

National team statistics

External links

1974 births
Living people
Colombian footballers
Colombian expatriate footballers
América de Cali footballers
Deportivo Cali footballers
Shonan Bellmare players
Millonarios F.C. players
Deportes Tolima footballers
Boca Juniors footballers
Expatriate footballers in Japan
Expatriate footballers in Argentina
Categoría Primera A players
J2 League players
Colombia under-20 international footballers
Colombia international footballers
2000 CONCACAF Gold Cup players
2004 Copa América players
Association football defenders
Sportspeople from Cauca Department
Footballers at the 1995 Pan American Games
Pan American Games bronze medalists for Colombia
Pan American Games medalists in football
Medalists at the 1995 Pan American Games